The Chir is a river in Rostov and Volgograd oblasts of Russia.

References

Rivers of Rostov Oblast
Rivers of Volgograd Oblast